Gundam Song Covers 2 is a cover album by Hiroko Moriguchi, released in 2020 to coincide with the 35th anniversary of Moriguchi's music career. The sequel to 2019's Gundam Song Covers, the album features Moriguchi's versions of 10 popular Gundam songs, as voted on King Records' website from January to February 2020. It was released in two physical CD versions: a regular release and a limited edition release with an LP-sized jacket with a booklet and stickers. The album cover, illustrated by Tsukasa Kotobuki, features Moriguchi cosplaying as Cecily Fairchild, with the Gundam F91 in the background.

The album was originally planned for release on June 10, 2020, but due to the ongoing COVID-19 pandemic, the release date was pushed to September 16, 2020.

Upon its release, Gundam Song Covers 2 sold 33,000 copies and peaked at No. 2 on Oricon's Weekly Album Ranking on September 20, 2020, making it Moriguchi's highest charting album in her career.

Track listing 
All tracks are arranged by Kōichirō Tokinori, except 1 by Naoki Kitajima, 4 by Satoshi Takebe, 5 by Kotaro Oshio, and 8 by Satoru Shionoya.

Personnel
 Naoko Terai - violin (track 1)
 Masato Honda - saxophone (track 3)
 Satoshi Takebe - piano (track 4)
 Kotaro Oshio - acoustic guitar (track 5)
 Satoru Shionoya - piano (track 8)
 The Voices of Japan (VOJA) - chorus (track 12)

Charts

References

External links 
 (Hiroko Moriguchi)
 (King Records)

2020 albums
Hiroko Moriguchi albums
Covers albums
Gundam
Japanese-language albums
King Records (Japan) albums
Albums postponed due to the COVID-19 pandemic
Sequel albums